IAAS can refer to the following:

Organisations
 International Association for Astronomical Studies, a youth astronomy and aerospace research group based out of Denver, Colorado with a 40+ year history of success in the youth STEM fields. 

 Incorporated Association of Architects and Surveyors, former name of the British professional body Association of Building Engineers
 International Association for Shell and Spatial Structures
 Institute of Agriculture and Animal Science, institute of Tribhuvan University, Nepal
 International Association of Students in Agricultural and Related Sciences, Belgium-based international organisation
 International Association for Ambulatory Surgery, Belgium-based international organisation
 Independent Academies Assured Services

Other
 Infrastructure as a service, a cloud computing service model
 Indian Audits and Accounts Service, an Indian Civil Service